Os Jogos do Mundo is the fourth album by the Portuguese music composer António Pinho Vargas. It was released in 1989.

Personnel
 António Pinho Vargas - piano
 José Nogueira - alto saxophone and soprano saxophone
 Pedro Barreiros - double bass
 Mário Barreiros - drums
 Quico - synthesizers
 Rui Júnior - tablas and percussion instruments

António Pinho Vargas albums
1989 albums